The 2006 Solomon Islands National Club Championship was the 3rd season of the National Club Championship in the Solomon Islands. Marist FC won the league for the first time. All matches were played at the hillside ground called Lawson Tama Stadium, with an approximate capacity of 20,000.

Teams 
 Aimela FC
 Central United FC
 Koloale FC
 Kuara FC
 Mafi United
 Marist FC
 Mobile Cools
 Ngaube FC
 New Jersey FC
 Tematangi FC
 Uncles FC

Pools

Pool A

Pool B

Knockout stage

Semi-finals

Third place match

Final

References 

Solomon Islands S-League seasons
2006 in Solomon Islands sport